Mount Naab is a mountain in Antarctica, to the south of Mount Schmidtman, 1,710 m, which surmounts the east part of Eastwind Ridge in the Convoy Range.

It was mapped by United States Geological Survey (USGS) from ground surveys and Navy air photos and named by Advisory Committee on Antarctic Names (US-ACAN) in 1964 for Captain Joseph Naab, Jr., USCG, commanding officer of the icebreaker Eastwind during 1961 and 1962.

Mountains of Victoria Land
Scott Coast